Arjun Reddy is a 2017 Indian Telugu-language romantic drama film written and directed by Sandeep Reddy Vanga, and produced by his brother Pranay Reddy Vanga's company Bhadrakali Pictures. It stars Vijay Deverakonda and Shalini Pandey while Rahul Ramakrishna, Jia Sharma, Sanjay Swaroop, Gopinath Bhat, Kamal Kamaraju and Kanchana appear in supporting roles. The film tells the story of Arjun Reddy Deshmukh (Deverakonda), a high-functioning alcoholic surgeon who has anger management problems. Arjun is on a self-destructive path after the marriage of his girlfriend Preethi Shetty (Pandey); the film focuses on his downfall and subsequent resurgence.

Arjun Reddy was partially inspired by Sandeep Vanga's life as a physiotherapy student. He worked on the script for two years and it took four to five years for the film to materialise. Principal photography commenced on 20 June 2016 at Hyderabad and took 86 working days to complete. Other filming locations include Mangalore, Dehradun and New Delhi, filming also took place in Italy. Radhan and Harshvardhan Rameshwar composed the soundtrack and score, respectively. Raj Thota was director of photography and Shashank Mali edited the film.

Made on a budget of 5–5.15 crore; the film was released worldwide on 25 August 2017. It received widespread critical acclaim for its direction, writing, cinematography and the cast performances—especially that of Deverakonda, but drew criticism for allegedly promoting substance abuse among young people and for its sex scenes. . The film was a box office success, grossing 51 crore globally, with a distributor share of 26 crore. It received six nominations at the 65th Filmfare Awards South, including Best Telugu Film and Best Telugu Director for Vanga; the film's only win was Best Telugu Actor for Deverakonda. The film was remade in Hindi as Kabir Singh (2019) and twice in Tamil: as Adithya Varma (2019) and Varmaa (2020).

Plot 
Arjun Reddy Deshmukh is a house surgeon at St. Mary's Medical College in Mangalore, India. Despite being a brilliant student, he has severe anger management problems that earn the wrath of the college dean. Arjun's aggressive nature also earns him a reputation among his juniors as a college bully. After a brawl alongside his friend Kamal against members of the opposing team during an inter-college football match the dean asks Arjun to either apologise or leave the college. Arjun initially chooses to leave the college, but stays back after meeting first-year student Preethi Shetty.

Arjun and his friend Shiva enter a third-year classroom and announce that Arjun is in love with Preethi and asserts that she is exclusive to him. Initially afraid, Preethi starts adjusting to Arjun's overbearing attitude. She eventually reciprocates his feelings and they develop an intimate relationship. Arjun graduates with an MBBS degree and leaves for Mussoorie to pursue a Master's degree in Orthopedic surgery. Over the course of three years, Arjun's and Preethi's relationship becomes stronger. Months later, Arjun visits Preethi's house, where her father sees them kissing and throws Arjun out.

Preethi's father opposes her and Arjun's relationship due to Arjun's brash behaviour and also because they belong to different castes. Arjun demands Preethi decide within six hours otherwise he will end their relationship. Following this incident, Preethi's parents seize her phone, preventing her from contacting Arjun. By the time she manages to visit Arjun's house, he is drunk, injects morphine into himself, and becomes unconscious for two days. Preethi is then forcibly married to someone from her caste. Arjun learns about the marriage from Shiva and goes to her house. He is assaulted and gets arrested for making a scene. Arjun's father throws him out of the family home for ruining his reputation.

With Shiva's help, Arjun rents a flat and joins a private hospital as a surgeon. To cope with his emotions, he starts taking drugs, attempts one-night stands, buys a pet dog and names it after Preethi and drinks alcohol; all of which are unsuccessful. Within months, he becomes a successful surgeon and a high-functioning alcoholic who is feared by the hospital's staff members, one of the reasons being his high surgery count. Arjun's self-destructing behaviour and refusal to move on worries Shiva and Kamal. He persuades one of his patients, Jia Sharma, a leading film star, to have a no-strings relationship with him, which he ends when she falls in love with him.

On a day off, Arjun unwillingly agrees to perform a life-saving surgery and collapses from dehydration. The hospital staff examines his blood samples, which show traces of alcohol and cocaine. The hospital chief files a case against Arjun, who accepts the truth on the grounds of violating his professional ethics during an in-house court hearing, despite Shiva making arrangements to bail him out. Arjun's medical license is cancelled for five years and he is evicted from the flat. The next morning, Shiva manages to reach Arjun to convey his grandmother's death; he meets his father, and they reconcile. Arjun gives up his self-destructive habits soon after.

While leaving for a vacation, Arjun sees a pregnant Preethi sitting in a park. Convinced that she is unhappy with her marriage, Arjun meets her after returning from his vacation. Preethi reveals that she left her husband days after their marriage and continued to work in a clinic. She tells Arjun that he is the child's father, and they reunite. The pair marries, and Preethi's father apologises for misunderstanding their love for each other.

Cast

Production

Development 

After discontinuing his studies as a physiotherapist, Sandeep Vanga worked in the 2010 Telugu film Kedi as an assistant director. He worked on the script of Arjun Reddy for two years and for four to five years approached producers who were not willing to finance the project until Vanga's brother Pranay Reddy agreed to do so. Pranay and Vanga's father invested in the film equally. The project was made under the production banner of Bhadrakali Pictures.

Arjun Reddy was partially inspired from Vanga's life as a physiotherapy student: "It is not my story but there are a lot of references from my life [...] Some of my medical college friends saw the film and said that Arjun reminds them of me." After working on a scene, he used to wait for a week as he believed that for a film with twists and turns, the narrative would have a chance to jump, thereby giving scope for cinematic liberties. For the same, whenever the idea for a plot twist came to him, Vanga used to work on it for three to four weeks.

In a September 2017 interview with Sangeetha Devi Dundoo of The Hindu, Vanga said he believed that Telugu cinema uses dialects spoken in Guntur and Vijayawada. Since he was unaware of the way of speaking in both the places, he wrote the dialogue in a Hyderabad Telangana accent. He made use of words that were rarely spoken in colloquial Telugu like yaralu (sister-in-law) to make Arjun look "real and rooted". Some of the dialogue was written in Tulu. With a dark mood prevailing for 100 minutes, Vanga wanted a happy ending for the film, with two or three options for the climax. He said he "didn't have the heart" to end the narrative on a sad note, considering the darkness Arjun was subjected to. The initial edit was 220 minutes long; this was reduced to 186 minutes.

Cast and crew 
Vanga initially approached Sharwanand to play the film's lead role. Sharwanand was at first apprehensive of Vanga handling the responsibilities of directing and producing the project but after reading the script, he changed his mind. He sent the script to many producers, who considered the project too risky to fund. After Sharwanand left the project, Vanga signed Vijay Deverakonda to play Arjun Reddy. Deverakonda's breakthrough film Pelli Choopulu (2016) had not yet been released, and many were against Vanga for casting him, citing it a risky move for a home production. In an interview with Indo-Asian News Service, Devarakonda called the portrayal of Arjun Reddy exhausting, noting that, "I had to be constantly probing into the darkest areas of my consciousness, digging out feelings and tapping into emotions I had never touched in myself". He did not have any cinematic references but watched films like The Godfather (1972), Scarface (1983) and Goodfellas (1990) to remain in an alpha male zone.

Arjun and Preethi had an age difference of four years, which Vanga wanted to showcase effectively. He chose Shalini Pandey to play Preethi; she was pursuing a career in theatre in Jabalpur. Pandey's father was apprehensive of her signing a film contract; the shoot delayed by five months. Pandey was firm in her decision, which strained her relationship with her father. Vanga wanted her to dub for her role, to which she agreed because it would help her own the character completely. Vanga conducted an eight-day acting workshop with Deverakonda and Pandey. Kanchana was cast as Arjun's grandmother in November 2016; Arjun Reddy marked her comeback to Telugu cinema after Shri Datta Darshanam (1985). The producers persuaded her to join the project after a series of long discussions.

Rahul Ramakrishna, who worked as a lyricist for Pelli Choopulu, was cast as Arjun's friend Shiva. Ramakrishna's career as a journalist helped him understand several dialects, which in turn had a positive effect on his performance. He called Shiva's friendship with Arjun "loyal and unconditional", which gives them the liberty to deride each other at times. Amit Sharma was chosen after a three-hour audition; Vanga felt he "had the apt attitude and arrogance" for the role of Amit, Arjun's nemesis. Bhushan Kalyan played the role of the college's dean. Tulu actor Gopinath Bhat was cast as Preethi's father. Sanjay Swaroop, Kamal Kamaraju, Jia Sharma and Priyadarshi Pulikonda were cast in other important roles.

Nagesh Banell was initially the film's director of photography. He was replaced by Raj Thota later, who worked for 85% of the film. Deverakonda recommended him; he did the clash work for Pelli Choopulu whose cinematography was handled by Banell. Vanga worked on the film's sound design and worked with Sachin Hariharan of Sync Cinema. Harshavardhan Rameshwar composed the background score. Shashank Mali edited the film.

Filming 
Principal photography commenced in Hyderabad on 20 June 2016. Kanchana joined the film's sets on 30 November 2016. The protagonists' college life portions were filmed at the three heritage buildings of the University college of Hampankatta, Mangalore. Other filming locations included Dehradun and Delhi in India and parts of Italy. According to Deverakonda, Vanga wanted to set the film in a coastal city and chose Mangalore—mirroring his student life in Dharwad—and stayed there for ten days to finalise the locations. In an interview with Idlebrain.com, Vanga said, "When you write a script, you think about a particular location. But, it scared me when we got worst of locations for some of the scenes. But it didn't matter because our attention would be on characters. I realised that when content is clear, locations doesn't matter most of the times."

The principal photography was completed in 86 working days, and was made on a budget of 5–5.15 crore. Vanga preferred long, uninterrupted takes; the pre-Intermission sequence was seven minutes long. According to Deverakonda, if filmed in conventional style, Vanga would have finished the film in 200 working days. For a few scenes, Thota used a hand-held camera weighing , which adversely affected his hands. The classroom fight scene featuring Deverakonda, Pandey and Sharma was filmed in a single take; Sharma wanted Deverakonda to actually hit him to make the scene look natural. He said their experience in theatre helped their performances. The crew wanted to film the intermission scene, in which Arjun urinates in his pants, authentically but a delay in the shoot led to the insertion of a medical hosepipe in Deverakonda's trousers.

Music 

The soundtrack of Arjun Reddy consists of seven songs, all of which were composed by Radhan. Ananta Sriram, Rambabu Gosala and Shreshta wrote the lyrics of two songs each while Mandela Pedaswamy was the lyricist of "Mari Mari". Shreshta wrote the lyrics for "Madhurame" and "Gundelona"; she composed the latter's tune, which lacked instrumental support. "Gundelona" is the debut of Sowjanya as a playback singer.

As a part of the film's marketing, the first single from the soundtrack, titled "Mangaluru – Mussorie" (later known as "Dhooram") was released on 23 April 2017. Three more singles— "The Breakup Song" (later known as "Teliseney Na Nuvvey"), "Emitemito" and "Madhurame"—were released on 19 June 10 and 31 July 2017, respectively. Srivathsan Nadadhur, writing for The Hindu, said "The Breakup song", along with "Break-Up" from Rarandoi Veduka Chudham (2017) and "Badulu Cheppave" from Ninnu Kori (2017) is an instance in which Telugu cinema "continued in Kolaveri mode too intermittently" in the first half of 2017. The film's soundtrack was marketed by Aditya Music and was released at an audio-release promotional event in Hyderabad on 21 August 2017.

The film's music received a positive response from critics. Sangeetha Devi Dundoo of The Hindu wrote that Radhan's music, which varies from "classical strains to more trippy beats", was one of the factors, along with the cinematography, that brought Arjun Reddy to life. Neeshita Nyayapati writing for The Times of India said the songs "deserve a special mention" and that Radhan did a "brilliant job". Namrata Suri of The News Minute wrote that Arjun Reddy has one of the "most original soundtracks composed by Radhan", and that "Madhurame" and "The Breakup song" are the memorable songs from the film. In December 2017, Nadadhur commented; "For a film so brutally raw and honest, Arjun Reddy got its aura from its music as much as the swag of Vijay Deverakonda". He added that the heavy metal undertone matched up to the "extremities and mood swings of its lead character". Nadadhur also praised the use of semi-classical and jazzy touches in the soundtrack.

Release 
Arjun Reddy was given an 'A' (adult) certificate by the Central Board of Film Certification due to the abundance of expletives and innuendoes. Vanga complained that the board took his creative struggle for granted. He considered writing a letter to the board asking what was taken into consideration before certification. The board complained that the producers of the film had not submitted their promotional material for censoring before using it. Asian Cinemas and KFC Entertainments acquired the film's distribution rights for Telangana and Andhra Pradesh. Nirvana Cinemas distributed the film in overseas markets. The teaser of the film was released on 27 February 2017, and the trailer was released on 12 August 2017.

Days before the film's release, Indian National Congress party's Rajya Sabha member V. Hanumantha Rao tore promotional posters featuring the lead pair kissing each other that had been pasted on TSRTC buses. He found them objectionable and said they adversely affected the minds of young people. It led the film's promoters to remove such posters across Telangana and Andhra Pradesh.

Arjun Reddy was released worldwide on 25 August 2017, notably clashing with Indian films Vivegam and A Gentleman. In Hyderabad, 55 paid premieres were held a day before the release, surpassing the record set by Baahubali 2: The Conclusion which had 33 premiere shows. The film's digital rights were acquired by Amazon Prime Video, which made it available online on the 50th day of theatrical release. Star Maa purchased the satellite rights for 3.5 crore. The film had its global television premiere on 21 January 2018, with a TRP rating of 13.6. The film was substantially edited for in its television premiere, drawing criticism from its audience.

Reception

Box office 
Arjun Reddy opened to a 100% occupancy in some areas of India, including districts of Telangana and Andhra Pradesh. At the United States box office, the film debuted with earnings of US$194,051 from its premieres and of US$709,347 in two days. By the end of its first weekend, it grossed US$954,677 in the US, and A$111,521 in Australia. Arjun Reddy grossed 19 crore globally, with a distributor share of 10.42 crore in its first weekend. The film was declared commercially successful as it earned a profit of 73.66% for its distributors. Arjun Reddy earnings exceeded US$1 million on its fourth day of theatrical release in the US, becoming the 32nd Indian Telugu-language film to do so.

By the end of its first week, the film grossed 34.3 crore and a distributor share of 18.5 crore, providing a return of nearly 200% to its distributors. After earning US$1,681,996 in 17 days in the US, Arjun Reddy became the fourth highest grossing Telugu film of the year in that country. By then, it had grossed a worldwide total of 45 crore and a distributor share of 25 crore. In its complete global theatrical run, Arjun Reddy grossed a total of 51 crore and earned a distributor share of 26 crore.

Critical response 
Arjun Reddy received positive reviews from critics. Writing for Film Companion, Baradwaj Rangan said that while the pre-interval sequences were generic, the "prickly" latter portions justified both the film's title and the running time. Rangan called Arjun Reddy a film that "digs deep [and] rings true" and said it "really comes into its own" in the second half. S. Shiva Kumar of The Hindu wrote that Vanga's storytelling had a "conviction and confidence probably only a debutante will have". He found the performances, especially those of Deverakonda and Kanchana, "pitch perfect". Sangeetha Devi Dundoo said the film is "too raw and real to be absolutely fictional" and commented: "Hours after watching Arjun Reddy, it’s hard to shake off its effect. It’s like a hangover, albeit in a good way."

Indo-Asian News Service gave the film five stars out of five, called it the "most original, experimental and daring work to come out Telugu cinema in a long time", and said the protagonist's "rise, fall and rise ... is nothing short of poetic and heart wrenching". Neeshita Nyayapati gave the film four stars out of five and commented: "With Arjun Reddy, Sandeep Vanga has managed to tell a story that is seldom told, without sleaze or cheesy lines or [over the top] drama". Srivatsan of India Today also gave the film four stars out of five and wrote: "Lo and behold, Arjun Reddy—the film and Vijay Deverakonda, is something that the Telugu industry deserved in the first place", and praised the "brutal and honest" filmmaking. Suresh Kavirayani of Deccan Chronicle also gave the film four stars out of five and commended the performances and the filmmaking but was apprehensive of the second half's pace. The Times of India, also gave four stars stating "Arjun Reddy is the dawn of a new era of films for the Telugu film industry."

Hemanth Kumar, in his review for Firstpost gave 3.75 stars out of five and praised the storytelling in particular, saying: "There are no gimmicks, no surprises, no twists. And in doing so, we are forced to absorb the film at a more personal and subconscious level." Latha Srinivasan, in her review for NewsX, wrote that the protagonist is "unconventional, free-spirited and tries to break the shackles of traditional societal norms". She said the romance is "rooted in deep emotions" and gave the film 3.5 stars out of five. Giving three stars out of five, K. Naresh Kumar of The Hans India was critical of the film's pace and a few subplots in the second half. He wrote: "As a tale of a love-struck man, who falters and finally figures out what is best for him, the experiment that the director undertakes is tedious, stretching out time and again". Murali Krishna CH, in his review for the Cinema Express, praised the unpredictability of the first half but was apprehensive of some emotional scenes in the second half; he found them a "serious flaw" after the intermission.

Controversies

Toxic masculinity 
The film has also drawn criticism for its misogyny and glorification of toxic masculinity. Sowmya Rajendran, in her review for The News Minute, panned its "utterly colourless" female characters and validation of abusive behaviour, writing: "The film treats women as property, to be under the protection and control of men ... [it] will have us believe that women have no opinions about anything that happens to them or around them." Malini Raghu of Deccan Herald concurred, stating: "portraying [Reddy] as just a wounded and short-tempered but affectionate boy is not acceptable to many [...] The female lead's gullibility is annoying, especially to women. All she does is keep mum and boost her man's ego." Vishnupriya Bhandaram of Firstpost found the film's depiction of misbehavior as an alpha male attribute to be "deeply problematic", while Sify's Ashley Tellis classified it as "part of the culture of misogyny that has always existed in Telugu (and Tamil and all Indian film cultures)." Speaking to The Asian Age, Neelima Menon opined that "it's problematic when you add celebratory background score to an act of verbally abusing a woman with sexually coloured remarks, or beating her up, or decide to make these acts sound heroic." Writing for Mashable, Pramit Chatterjee summed up the film as "the flag-bearer of 21st-century toxic masculinity".

In 2019, actress Parvathy criticised Arjun Reddy at a roundtable organised by Film Companion for glorifying misogyny, abuse and toxic masculinity in the films at International Film Festival of India (IFFI). Her comments against Arjun Reddy were met with widespread appreciation and criticism with many noting that she was brave enough to address the issue in front of Deverakonda. Later, Deverakonda criticised social media trollers during an interview for blowing the issue out of proportion while simultaneously emphasising on how much he respected Parvathy and her work.

Glorification of substance and sexual abuse 
Post-release, Hanumantha Rao lodged a complaint against the film, stating that it promoted sexual abuse in colleges and substance abuse in hospitals. He also asked K. Chandrashekar Rao, the chief minister of Telangana, to stop the film's screening across the state. A week after the film's release, D. Nagaraju from Khammam accused the film's makers of plagiarising his script and demanded compensation of 2 crore. In Vijayawada, women's organisations held a protest against the film, complaining of its "objectionable" content that could have a negative impact on young people.

Accolades

Remakes 
Arjun Reddy was remade in Hindi by Vanga himself as Kabir Singh, which was released on 21 June 2019. The film was first remade in Tamil by Bala as Varmaa; however in early 2019 the production company E4 Entertainment shelved the film's release due to creative differences with Bala, and relaunched the film as Adithya Varma with Gireesaaya directing, which was released on 21 November 2019. Despite initially being shelved, Varmaa was released on 6 October 2020. In June 2019, producer S. Narayan bought the Kannada remake rights of the film. E4 Entertainment also holds the rights to make a Malayalam version. In 2021, Yuva Films, a Nepali film production company was reported to be producing a Nepali version of Arjun Reddy.

Notes

References

External links 
 
 

2010s avant-garde and experimental films
2010s Telugu-language films
2017 directorial debut films
2017 films
2017 independent films
2017 romantic drama films
Film controversies
Film controversies in India
Films about alcoholism
Films about depression
Films about surgeons
Films involved in plagiarism controversies
Films set in Karnataka
Films shot in Karnataka
Indian avant-garde and experimental films
Indian independent films
Indian nonlinear narrative films
Indian romantic drama films
Medical-themed films
Obscenity controversies in film
Sexual-related controversies in film
Telugu films remade in other languages